The Syracuse Orange women represented Syracuse University in CHA women's ice hockey during the 2015-16 NCAA Division I women's ice hockey season. The Orange finished conference play in second place, and advanced to the CHA Tournament Final, before losing to the Mercyhurst 4-3 in overtime.  It was the second consecutive year that the Orange took the championship into overtime.  Senior Melissa Piacentini was named CHA Player of the Year, while Nicole Renault was the CHA Defenseman of the Year.

Offseason
July 8: Fourteen players were named to the CHA All-Academic Team.
August 13:  2015 graduate Allison LaCombe signed a professional contract with the Vienna Sabres of EWHL.

Recruiting

Standings

Roster

2015–16 Orange

Schedule

|-
!colspan=12 style="background:#0a2351; "| Regular Season

|-
!colspan=12 style="background:#0a2351; "| CHA Tournament

Awards and honors
Melissa Piacentini, CHA Player of the Year
Nicole Renault, Defenseman of the Year
Jessica Sibley, Stephanie Grossi (tie), CHA Scoring Trophy
Jessica Sibley, CHA Best Defensive Forward
Stephanie Grossi F, All-CHA First Team
Nicole Renault D, All-CHA First Team
Melissa Piacentini F, 2014-15 All-CHA Second Team
Jessica Sibley F, 2014-15 All-CHA Second Team
Megan Quinn D, 2014-15 All-CHA Second Team

References

Syracuse
Syracuse Orange women's ice hockey seasons
Syracuse Orange
Syracuse Orange